Bárbula Tunnel (Spanish: Túnel de Bárbula) is a partly-constructed railway tunnel in Venezuela. It is between Las Trincheras and Naguanagua in Carabobo state. 
The tunnel has a length of 7.8 km (4.8 mi), which makes it the longest in South America. 

The tunnel is part of a line under construction between the sea port city of Puerto Cabello, Carabobo State, and the crossroads town of La Encrucijada, Aragua State. Tunnels are required to provide a low gradient route through the mountains of the Venezuelan Coastal Range.
Bárbula Tunnel takes its name from Bárbula, a locality near Naguanagua.

Geology
Granitic rocks are typical of the geology of the area, but clay and alluvium, requiring special ground improvement, have been described as being characteristic of the tunnel.

History of the project
In the 19th century the Puerto Cabello and Valencia Railway was built along a similar route between Valencia and the coast. The tunnels on this line were short, and a rack section was used to deal with the gradients near Bárbula. The railway closed after World War II and traffic moved to road. Interest in railways revived in the country in the late 20th century.

Financial problems
Completion of the project was scheduled for 2010. 
In 2016 work on the railway was described as "irregular and marked by slow payments by the client as a result of the country’s poor economic conditions, mainly related to the drop in the price of oil."

References

Railway tunnels in South America
Tunnels in Venezuela